Chelsea is a historic home located near West Point, King William County, Virginia.  It was built in 1709, and consists of a two-story, brick main block with a hipped roof and -story, gambrel roofed rear ell. In 1764, Thomas Jefferson attended the wedding of an old friend, John Walker, at Chelsea; sources commonly say (and Jefferson eventually, in 1805, seemed to acknowledge) that he later repeatedly made improper advances to his friend's wife, all of which she rejected. In 1781, shortly before the Battle of Yorktown, Lafayette's army camped at Chelsea, and the Marquis de Lafayette used the house as his headquarters.

It was listed on the National Register of Historic Places in 1969.

References

External links
 Chelsea, Mattaponi River, West Point, King William County, VA at the Historic American Buildings Survey (HABS)

Houses on the National Register of Historic Places in Virginia
Houses completed in 1709
Houses in King William County, Virginia
National Register of Historic Places in King William County, Virginia
Historic American Buildings Survey in Virginia
1709 establishments in Virginia